Nacoleia is a genus of moths of the family Crambidae described by Francis Walker in 1859.

Species

Former species

References

 
Spilomelinae
Crambidae genera
Taxa named by Francis Walker (entomologist)